MBR may refer to:

Computing
 Master boot record, the first sector of a partitioned data storage device, used for booting
 Memory buffer register
 Minimum bounding rectangle
 Minimum bit rate

Publications
 The Malaysia Book of Records
 Mountain Bike Rider, a British magazine

Military
 Main battle rifle
 Morskoi Blizhniy Razvedchik, (Russian for "Naval Short Range Reconnaissance"), a class of flying boats, like the Beriev MBR-2

Places
 Middlesbrough railway station, England (by GBR code)
 Mohammed Bin Rashid Library, Dubai, United Arab Emirates

Science and technology
 Membrane bioreactor, in waste disposal
 Microwave background radiation, in cosmology
 Minimum bend radius, for installation of cables and pipes

Other uses
 Maximum base rent, as used in rent control in New York 
 Minerações Brasileiras Reunidas, an iron mining business

See also
 Movimiento Bolivariano Revolucionario 200 (MBR-200), a leftist political movement founded by Hugo Chávez in Venezuela